Ben Moxham (born 9 June 2001) is an Irish rugby union player who plays wing or centre for Ulster in the United Rugby Championship and the European Rugby Champions Cup.

A native of Larne, County Antrim, Moxham attended Larne High School where he mainly played soccer, until he joined Larne Rugby Club in about 2016. He was picked for Ulster at age-grade levels, and moved to All-Ireland League club Ballymena. He was first selected for Ireland under-20s in February 2020, and played in the 2020 Six Nations Under 20s Championship in July.

He made his senior debut for Ulster as a replacement against Connacht in December 2020. He made four appearances, all from the bench, in the 2020–21 season. He was selected for the 2021 Six Nations Under 20s Championship in June 2021, while studying Sports Studies at Ulster University.

He began the 2021-22 season in his second year in the Ulster Academy, and was upgraded to a development contract in December 2021. This season, he made 13 appearances, including six starts. He made first Champions Cup appearance in January 2022, and his first Champions Cup start against Toulouse in April.

References

External links
Ulster Rugby player profile
United Rugby Championship profile

2001 births
Living people
Irish rugby union players
Ulster Rugby players
Rugby union centres
Rugby union wings
Rugby union players from County Antrim